Black vinegar is dark-colored vinegar used in Chinese cuisine.

Types

China

One of the most important types of Chinese "black vinegar" is the Shanxi mature vinegar from the central plains of Northern China, particularly in the Shanxi province (Shanxi mature vinegar). It is made from sorghum, peas, barley, bran and chaff and has a much stronger smoky flavor than rice-based black vinegar. It is popular in the north of China as a dipping sauce, particularly for dumplings.

Another type of Chinese "black vinegar" is Zhenjiang vinegar and similar condiments from southern China. The condiment is an inky-black rice vinegar aged for a malty, woody, and smoky flavor. It is made from rice (usually glutinous), or sorghum, or in some combination of those, sometimes including wheat and millet. Black vinegar was traditionally aged in clay pots.

In Sichuan black vinegar is made from wheat bran and flavored with traditional medicinal spices. Sichuan's Baoning vinegar (保寧醋 or 保宁醋) is a famous example. 

Black vinegar from Fujian is made using glutinous rice and colored red by the infusion of a special fungus.

Taiwan

Taiwanese black vinegar is the most different with more in common with worcestershire sauce than other black vinegars. Its base is sticky rice which is then aged with other ingredients.

Japan

The Japanese kurozu, a somewhat lighter form of black vinegar, is made only from brown rice.

Korea

In Korea black vinegar is also made with brown rice.

History 
Ancient Chinese laborers used wine as a leavening agent to ferment and brew vinegar. East Asian vinegar originated in China, and there are at least three thousand years of documented history of making vinegar. In ancient China, "vinegar" was called "bitter wine," which also indicates that "vinegar" originated from "wine".

Uses
Black vinegar has been used as a full-flavored but less expensive alternative to traditional balsamic vinegar.

See also 
 Chinese rice vinegars

References

Rice drinks
Rice
Vinegar
Chinese condiments
Japanese condiments
Chinese drinks
Japanese drinks
Korean drinks